The Taedong Bridge is a bridge over the Taedong River in Pyongyang, North Korea.

The bridge was built by the Japanese and completed in 1905. It is one of Pyongyang's two oldest East-West connections via the Taedong Gang, along with the Yanggak Bridge, built in the same year.

It was largely destroyed in the Korean War. When Chinese troops advanced near Pyongyang in the winter of 1950, thousands of civilians fled to the rubble of the bridge to cross the river in which several people were killed. The crossing of the ruined Taedong Bridge was part of the larger evacuation of Pyongyang during the Korean War. The event was taken on December 5, 1950, by Associated Press photographer Max Desfor titled Flight of Refugees Across Wrecked Bridge in Korea, for which he won the Pulitzer Prize for Photography in 1951.

References 

Bridges in North Korea
Buildings and structures in Pyongyang